Ken Skupski and John-Patrick Smith were the defending champions but chose not to defend their title.

Dustin Brown and Antoine Hoang won the title after defeating Lloyd Glasspool and Alex Lawson 6–7(8–10), 7–5, [13–11] in the final.

Seeds

Draw

References

External links
 Main draw

Challenger Eckental - Doubles
2020 Doubles